Gotham City Gauntlet: Escape from Arkham Asylum, formerly known as Road Runner Express, is a steel wild mouse roller coaster at Six Flags New England in Agawam, Massachusetts.

History

In May 2000, Kentucky Kingdom in Louisville, Kentucky opened a new wild mouse roller coaster. It opened on the former site of The Vampire, (which was also relocated to Six Flags New England as Flashback). The ride operated as the Road Runner Express until the end of the 2009 season when Six Flags rejected the park's lease after a dispute with the Kentucky State Fair Board and closed the park. As part of Six Flags' settlement with the Kentucky State Fair Board, Road Runner Express was removed from the Kentucky Kingdom site and relocated to Six Flags New England. In 2011, the ride reopened as the Gotham City Gauntlet Escape From Arkham Asylum.

The coaster opened on a site that formerly housed the Batman Stunt Show arena and was previously prepared for the canceled Dark Knight indoor wild mouse roller coaster. The Gauntlet is generally a mirror image of the layout of the Dark Knight coaster that initially was intended to be installed on that same site.

Ride
Gotham City Gauntlet: Escape From Arkham Asylum follows the same layout as many other wild mouse roller coasters, with four people per individual car.

Theme
There are eight different Batman villain themed cars. The story of the ride is that passengers are going along with their car's villain to escape from Arkham Asylum. The ride was previously themed to The Looney Tunes when it was at Kentucky Kingdom.

See also
 2011 in amusement parks

References

External links
 

Roller coasters operated by Six Flags
Six Flags New England
Roller coasters in Massachusetts
Roller coasters introduced in 2000
Roller coasters introduced in 2011
Batman in amusement parks
Amusement rides that closed in 2009
Warner Bros. Global Brands and Experiences attractions
Arkham Asylum
Gotham City